Big Brother Polska 6 is the sixth season of the Polish reality television series Big Brother produced by EndemolShine Polska. The show returned after 11 years hiatus and premiered on March 17, 2019, on TVN 7. The season lasted 92 days, with the final on 16 June 2019.

Agnieszka Woźniak-Starak hosted the main show Big Brother Arena. Filip Chajzer and Małgorzata Ohme co-hosted companion shows Big Brother Nocą (Monday to Thursday after 23:00) and Big Brother Nocą+  on Saturday after 23:00. They also co-hosted Big Brother Raport (Saturday at 20:00) until April 13, when it was replaced by the daily hour episode of Big Brother.

For the first time of Big Brother Polska, viewers could follow the life of the housemates for 16 hours per day on the internet. There were 4 special premium live stream channels on the website of the internet streaming and video-on-demand service Player.

Production

The house 
For the first time ever in Big Brother history, the housemates will live in a proper building rather than a constructed house in a studio. The house is the same house was used in the Polish version of Top Model, located in  Gołków, a village nearby Warsaw. There are 66 cameras in the house, which are automatically controlled via a Wi-Fi network.

Season 7 
On June 12, 2019, It was revealed the seventh season will start in autumn 2019. Just three days before the finale, a housemate for the Big Brother 7, Karolina Włodarska, entered the house as a guest.

Housemates 
On Sunday, 10 March 2019, the public voted between 2 candidates - Agnieszka Raczyńska and Maciej Borowicz. Maciej Borowicz was chosen by the public to become the official housemate.

Nominations table

Notes

Ratings 
Official ratings are taken from Nielsen Audience Measurement.

References

External links 
Official site

06